HMS Dittisham was one of 93 ships of the  of inshore minesweepers built for the British Royal Navy. Their names were all chosen from villages ending in -ham. The minesweeper was named after Dittisham in Devon.

Design and description
In the early 1950s, the Royal Navy had a requirement for large numbers of minesweepers to counter the threat to British shipping from Soviet mines in the event of a conventional Third World War. The navy's existing minesweepers were obsolete, while the increasing sophistication of modern mines meant the mine warfare forces could not be supplemented by requisitioned fishing vessels as had been done in previous wars. As the navy did not have sufficient manpower to operate all the required ships in peacetime, it was planned to lay a large number up in reserve, so they could be manned by reservists (in may cases the crews of the fishing boats which would previously have been used in the same role) in time of emergency.

Displacement was  standard and  full load. The design armament for the class was a single Bofors 40 mm L/60 gun, although this was generally replaced by an Oerlikon 20 mm cannon.

Service
Dittisham was built by Fairlie Yacht and was launched on 23 October 1953 and completed on 29 June 1954. She was placed in reserve in 1955, being laid up at Hythe, Hampshire and Gosport. In 1968 she became a training tender to HMS Ganges, the Royal Navy's boys' training establishment at RNTE Shotley, where she was used to teach seamanship to the school's students. In 1973 she transferred to HMS Raleigh at Torpoint in 1973. In March 1983, she was sold to the Kingston Sea Cadets and became TS Steadfast. In April 1997, she was towed to Pounds Shipyard at Portsmouth and broken up.

References

 Blackman, R.V.B. ed. Jane's Fighting Ships (1953)
 
 
 
 
 
 

 

Ham-class minesweepers
Royal Navy ship names
1953 ships